Acta Physica Polonica is an open access peer-reviewed scientific journal covering research in physics. It was established by the Polish Physical Society in 1920. In 1970 is split into two journals  Acta Physica Polonica A and Acta Physica Polonica B. The two journals became independent in 1995, with series A published by the Institute of Physics of the Polish Academy of Sciences and series B published by the Jagiellonian University in cooperation with the Polish Academy of Arts and Sciences.

History
Acta Physica Polonica was established by the Polish Physical Society in 1920. In 1970 it was split into Acta Physica Polonica A (published by the Institute of Physics of the Polish Academy of Sciences), whose scope includes general physics, atomic and molecular physics, condensed matter physics, optics and quantum optics, biophysics, quantum information, and applied physics, and Acta Physica Polonica B (published by the Jagiellonian University), which covers mathematical physics, particle and nuclear physics, relativity, astrophysics, and statistical physics. The editors-in-chief are Jan Mostowski and Michał Praszałowicz. In 2008, Acta Physica Polonica B Proceedings Supplement was established.

Abstracting and Indexing
Acta Physica Polonica A has a 2013 impact factor of 0.604, while the B series has an impact factor of 0.998. Acta Physica Polonica B is part of the SCOAP3 initiative.

References

External links 
 Acta Physica Polonica A
 Acta Physica Polonica B

Physics journals
Polish Academy of Sciences academic journals
Publications established in 1920
Academic journals published by universities and colleges
Academic journals published by learned and professional societies